Belaturricula is a genus of sea snails, marine gastropod mollusks in the family Borsoniidae.

Species
Species within the genus Belaturricula include:
 Belaturricula dissimilis (Watson, 1886)
 Belaturricula ergata (Hedley, 1916)
 Belaturricula gaini (Lamy, 1910)
 Belaturricula turrita (Strebel, 1908) 
Species brought into synonymy
 Belaturricula antarctica Dell, 1990: synonym of Belaturricula gaini (Lamy, 1910)

References

  Bouchet, P.; Kantor, Y. I.; Sysoev, A.; Puillandre, N. (2011). A new operational classification of the Conoidea. Journal of Molluscan Studies. 77, 273-308
 Kantor, Yuri I., Myroslaw G. Harasewych, and Nicolas Puillandre. "A critical review of Antarctic Conoidea (Neogastropoda)." Molluscan Research 36.3 (2016): 153-206.

External links
 Antarctic Invertebrates : Belaturricula; accessed : 13 August 2011

 
Gastropod genera